Jerry Cipriani is a Canadian former soccer player who played in the USISL Pro League, Canadian National Soccer League, and the Canadian Professional Soccer League.

Playing career 
Cipriani began his career in 1995 with the New Hampshire Ramblers of the USISL Pro League. In 1996, he signed with St. Catharines Wolves of the Canadian National Soccer League. He made his debut for the club on June 2, 1996 in a match against Toronto Italia. In his debut season with St. Catharines he captured the Umbro Cup by finishing first in the cup standings. The following season the team won the regular season championship, and the CNSL Championship. He contributed in the clubs playoff run by recording two goals in the finals against Toronto Supra.

He helped the Wolves repeat their success when the club joined the Canadian Professional Soccer League by winning the CPSL Championship in the 1998, and 2001 season. In 2002, Cipriani signed with newly expansion franchise the Hamilton Thunder. He made his debut for the club on May 11, 2002 in a friendly match against Toronto Lynx. He made his official debut for Hamilton on May 23, 2002 against Vaughan Shooters, and recorded two goals in a 5-1 victory. His tenure in Hamilton was short lived due to a dispute with the team owner.

References 

Living people
Canadian soccer players
Canadian expatriate soccer players
St. Catharines Roma Wolves players
Hamilton Thunder players
USL Second Division players
Canadian Soccer League (1998–present) players
Canadian National Soccer League players
Association football midfielders
Year of birth missing (living people)
Association football defenders